The 29th Indian Brigade was an infantry brigade of the British Indian Army that saw active service with the Indian Army during the First World War.  Formed in October 1914, it raided Sheik Saiad en route to Egypt, defended the Suez Canal in early 1915, before taking part in the Gallipoli Campaign (April to December 1915).  On returning to Egypt it acted as an independent formation being broken up in June 1917.

History
Formation
The 29th Indian Brigade was formed in October 1914 as part of Indian Expeditionary Force F (along with the 28th and 30th Indian Brigades) and sent to Egypt. En route to Egypt it raided Sheik Saiad (10–11 November).  The Ottoman Empire maintained a small fort at Sheik Saiad guarding the entrance to the Red Sea.  Having destroyed the Ottoman fortifications, the brigade re-embarked and continued on to Suez.

10th Indian Division
After arriving in Egypt, it joined the 10th Indian Division when it was formed on 24 December.  It served on the Suez Canal Defences, notably taking part in the Actions on the Suez Canal on 3–4 February 1915.  After the defeat of the Turkish attempts to cross the canal, the division was dispersed and the brigade was sent to Gallipoli in April 1915.

Gallipoli

The brigade formed Indian Expeditionary Force G for service in Gallipoli, the only Indian Army formation to serve on the peninsula. From 1 May to 7 July 1915 it was attached to the British 29th Division at Cape Helles. While with the division, it was in reserve for the Second Battle of Krithia (6–8 May), but played a more major role at Gurkha Bluff (12 May), the Third Battle of Krithia (4 June) and the Battle of Gully Ravine (28 June–2 July).

The brigade was switched to ANZAC Cove where it was attached to the Australian and New Zealand Army Corps, with which it took part in the Battle of Sari Bair (6–21 August 1915).  1st Battalion, 6th Gurkha Rifles was the only unit to reach the top of the ridge and see the Dardanelles; shelled by the Royal Navy, a Turkish counter-attack drove them off. The brigade's involvement at Gallipoli came at a high price: the 14th Sikhs, alone, suffered 264 killed and 840 wounded while serving at Gallipoli.

Independent
On 7 January 1916, the 10th Indian Division was reformed as part of the Suez Canal District, and the brigade joined it.  The need to return depleted units that had served in France to India meant that this was short-lived.  The division was broken up on 7 March and the brigade became an independent formation.  It continued to serve on the Suez Canal Defences.

In March 1917, the Egyptian Expeditionary Force started forming the British 75th Division, originally to be made up of Territorial Force battalions arriving from India.  In May 1917, to speed up the formation of the division, it was decided to incorporate Indian battalions. To this end, the 29th Indian Brigade was broken up in June 1917 and its battalions posted to 75th Division.

Orders of battle

Commanders
The brigade had the following commanders:

See also

 Force in Egypt

Notes

References

Bibliography

External links
 

Brigades of India in World War I
Military units and formations established in 1914
Military units and formations disestablished in 1917